The 1984 Asian Basketball Confederation Championship for Women were held in Shanghai, China.

Preliminary round

Group A

Group B

Second round 

 The results and the points of the matches between the same teams that were already played during the preliminary round shall be taken into account for the second round.

Classification 7th–10th

Championship

Final round

3rd place

Final

Final standing

Awards

References
 Results
 archive.fiba.com

1984
1984 in women's basketball
women
International women's basketball competitions hosted by China
B
1984 in Chinese women's sport